Princes of the Apocalypse is an adventure module for the 5th edition of the Dungeons & Dragons fantasy role-playing game.

Summary 

Across the North of Faerûn, four different elemental cults have caused natural disasters by utilizing devastation orbs. Secretly, the cults have come together to unleash an unknown catastrophic force. These cults are devoted to the Princes of Elemental Evil and serve the Elder Elemental Eye. Each cult is led by a prophet: 

 The air cult, Cult of the Howling Hatred, is led by the elf princess Aerisi Kalinoth
 The earth cult, Cult of the Black Earth, is led by the male medusa Marlos Urnrayle
 The fire cult, Cult of the Eternal Flame, is led by the tiefling Vanifer
 The water cult, Cult of the Crushing Wave, is led by the sailor Gar Shatterkeel

This campaign takes characters from level 1 through level 15 as adventurers battle the elemental cults across the North and work to uncover their true agenda. It is set in the Forgotten Realms year 1491 DR.

Publication history 

In January 2015, Wizards of the Coast announced their new Elemental Evil storyline which included their new adventure module Princes of the Apocalypse. Wizards of the Coast collaborated with Sasquatch Game Studios to produce this book.

Princes of the Apocalypse was published on April 7, 2015. A free corresponding player's guide, Elemental Evil Player’s Companion, was released earlier as a PDF on March 10, 2015. The spells and the genasi race from the Elemental Evil Player’s Companion are reprinted in the adventure's appendices, though the goliath and aarakocra races and the duergar subrace for dwarves are not reprinted in Princes of the Apocalypse.

Reception 
Jason Louv, for Boing Boing, wrote that "Princes of the Apocalypse is built as a sandbox adventure. This is a massive improvement over the Tyranny of Dragons campaign, which suffered from heavy railroading (the bane of all tabletop role-playing) and single-outcome adventures."

For SLUG Magazine's review, Henry Glasheen wrote that "I've found that many of the humanoid and elemental monsters fill in the challenge gaps left in their sections in the Monster Manual, making Princes of the Apocalypse an indispensable resource for creating my custom campaigns. [...] If you run Princes of the Apocalypse well, your players are going to be telling stories about it for the rest of your natural lifetime".

Shawn Ellsworth, for Tribality's review, wrote that "Elemental Evil: Princes of the Apocalypse is a flexible campaign that balances the line between a plot driven and sandbox campaign, providing exploration, investigation, temple delving and more."

References

External links 

 Wizards of the Coast product page
 Online supplement for running this adventure without the Monster Manual or Dungeon Master's Guide
 Princes of the Apocalypse Errata

Dungeons & Dragons modules
Role-playing game supplements introduced in 2015